General Alexej Čepička (18 August 1910 – 30 September 1990) was a Czechoslovak communist politician who served as defense minister from 1950 to 1956.

Early years
Čepička was born into a poor family. He studied law in Prague. At the age of 19 he joined the Communist Party of Czechoslovakia but was not very politically active. Later, he worked in advocacy. In 1942 he was imprisoned by Gestapo and was held in Auschwitz and Buchenwald concentration camps until the end of World War II.

Political career
After his return to Kroměříž Čepička got involved in local administration, dealing brutally, quickly, and effectively with post war chaos. He married the daughter of Klement Gottwald, the leader of the Communist Party, who later became prime minister and President of Czechoslovakia.

As a candidate of the Communist Party, Čepička was voted into parliament in the 1946 elections. In 1947, he was named into the position of minister of domestic trade (ministr vnitřního obchodu). 

After the Communist takeover of power in 1948, he became Minister of Justice. In this position he let the law system be dominated by the will of the Communist Party; a law prosecuting political opponents was approved and put into full force. In 1950, he was named head of the state commission dealing with churches (Státní úřad pro věci církevní). His task in this position was to suppress any sign of resistance from religious organisations, especially from the Catholic Church.

He belonged to the so called "big seven", top party and state leaders, along with President Gottwald, Prime Minister Zápotocký, Central Committee Secretary Antonín Novotný, Minister of the Interior Václav Nosek, Minister of Foreign Affairs Viliam Široký and Minister of Information Václav Kopecký.

Minister of Defence
During 1950-56, Čepička served as Minister of Defence. According to historian Karel Kaplan, Čepička was ordered by Joseph Stalin personally to prepare the Czechoslovak Army for incursion into Western Europe area. The preparations included militarisation of the society, purges of those suspected of low loyalty to the new regime, salary rises of army officers, and growth in numbers of army personnel.

While he was the Minister of Defence, he proposed the Hotel International Prague and envisioned a monument to the newly formed Fourth Czechoslovak Republic that would reinforce ties with the Soviet Union.

The Fall
After the death of Stalin and Gottwald in 1953 the prospect of immediate war lessened and Čepička's position became precarious. Leaders of the Communist Party were afraid of his political ambitions and rumours of his being homosexual did not help his popularity. In his book Špión vypovídá defector Josef Frolík stated that  had Čepička followed and the general was eventually caught in Letná Park talking to a young man at night.

Čepička was selected as a scapegoat for the cult of personality around Gottwald, dismissed from all functions in 1956 and put into low importance position as head of state patent office (1956-59). In 1959 he suffered a heart attack and was sent into comfortable retirement.

Continuing liberalisation of political life made him a symbol of the past wrongs and in 1963 Čepička was expelled from the Communist Party for his role in the "deformations of the 50s".

Čepička spent the rest of his life in retirement, never entered politics again, and died forgotten.

In fiction
In 1969 Miroslav Švandrlík  wrote Black Barons (Czech: Černí baroni), a satirical book  officially published in 1990, after the fall of the Communist Party from power. The book and its sequels became popular and were followed by a film and TV series. The book subtitle "We waged war under Čepička" reminds us of the then Minister of Defense Alexej Čepička. One of the main characters in the book, major Terazky,  is shown as a comical character, hopelessly trying to turn stupid army officers and bored conscripts into feared warriors, and this image of him as a clown underscores the absurdity of the socialist army.

Literature
 Karel Kaplan, Dans les Archives du comité central: Trente ans de secrets du bloc soviétique, Paris: Michel, 1978, pp. 165-66; 
 Jiří Pernes, Jaroslav Pospíšil, Antonín Lukáš: Alexej Čepička - Šedá eminence rudého režimu (Alexej Čepička - the Grey Eminence of the Red regime), Prague, 2008, .

References

External links
 Short biography 
 List of functions held by Čepička 

1910 births
1990 deaths
People from Kroměříž
People from the Margraviate of Moravia
Communist Party of Czechoslovakia politicians
Defence Ministers of Czechoslovakia
Members of the Constituent National Assembly of Czechoslovakia
Members of the National Assembly of Czechoslovakia (1948–1954)
Members of the National Assembly of Czechoslovakia (1954–1960)
Czech generals
Auschwitz concentration camp survivors
Buchenwald concentration camp survivors
Charles University alumni